Langthorpe is a village and civil parish in the Harrogate district of North Yorkshire, England. The population of the civil parish taken at the 2011 Census was 812.  It is situated to the immediate north of Boroughbridge on the A168 road.

History
The village is mentioned in the Domesday Book as Torp in the Hallikeld hundred. The lands were the possession of Gospatric, son of Arnketil both before and after the Norman invasion.

There was a brewery, Warwick's Anchor Brewery, in the village, but now disused.

Governance
The village lies within the Skipton and Ripon UK Parliament constituency. It is also within the Boroughbridge electoral division of North Yorkshire County Council and the Newby ward of Harrogate Borough District Council.

Geography

The nearest settlements are Boroughbridge  to the south; Milby  to the north-east; Kirby Hill  to the north and Skelton-on-Ure  to the west.

The 2001 UK Census recorded the parish population as 774 of which 638 are over sixteen years old and 412 of those were in employment. There were 327 dwellings of which 122 were detached.

References

External links

Villages in North Yorkshire
Civil parishes in North Yorkshire